Kermia cylindrica is a species of sea snail, a marine gastropod mollusk in the family Raphitomidae.

Description
The length of the shell attains 4 mm.

(Original description) The cylindrically fusiform shell is shining. The apex is very blunt. The shell is very longitudinally strongly ribbed and very transversely ornamented with raised striae, forming deep cancellations. The whorls are very slightly convex and angulated at the sutures. The aperture is very oval. The colour of the shell is very white.

Distribution
This species occurs in the Pacific Ocean off Hawaii and the Tuamotus.

References

External links
 Kermia cylindrica in different colours
 
 Moretzsohn, Fabio, and E. Alison Kay. "HAWAIIAN MARINE MOLLUSCS." (1995)
 Tröndlé, J. E. A. N., and Michel Boutet. "Inventory of marine molluscs of French Polynesia." Atoll Research Bulletin (2009)
 
 Gastropods.com: Kermia cylindrica

cylindrica
Gastropods described in 1860